Sheikha Lubna bint Khalid bin Sultan Al Qasimi,  (born 4 February 1962) is an Emirati politician and member of the ruling family of Sharjah and the niece to Sheikh Sultan bin Muhammad Al-Qasimi. She was previously the Minister of State for Tolerance, Minister of State for International Cooperation, and Minister of Economic and Planning of the United Arab Emirates (UAE). She was the first woman to hold a ministerial post in the United Arab Emirates.

In March 2014, she was appointed President of Zayed University. As of 2017, she is listed as the 36th most powerful woman in the world by Forbes. She was listed in the "Top 100 most powerful Arabs" in 2013 and from 2016-18 by Gulf Business.

History

Lubna graduated from the California State University, Chico with a bachelor's degree in Computer Science, and has an Executive MBA from the American University of Sharjah. Lubna received an honorary doctorate of science from California State University, Chico.

She returned to the UAE to work as a programmer for software company Datamation in 1981. She was the Dubai branch manager for the General Information Authority, the organization responsible for automating the federal government of the United Arab Emirates. After this posting, she worked for seven years in the Dubai Ports Authority (DPA).

As part of a cabinet reshuffle, the prime minister of UAE, Mohammed bin Rashid Al Maktoum, announced that Sheikha Lubna would take a post as a minister in the newly established Ministry of tolerance.

Honours and awards
 36th most powerful woman in the world by Forbes.
 Lifetime Achievement Award at Asia HRD Congress 2012
 Honorary Dame Commander of The Most Excellent Order of the British Empire, 2013

References

External links
 Forbes Profile 
 Women One Profile
 Bird's Eye View Leadership Profile

1962 births
Living people
American University of Sharjah alumni
California State University, Chico alumni
Government ministers of the United Arab Emirates
Lubna Al Qasimi
People from the Emirate of Sharjah
Emirati Muslims
Women government ministers of the United Arab Emirates
Honorary Dames Commander of the Order of the British Empire
21st-century women politicians
20th-century women politicians